Syed Aminul Hasan Jafri is an Indian journalist and a Member of Legislative Council from All India Majlis-e-Ittehadul Muslimeen party of the Indian state of Telangana. Jafri is the current pro tem chairman of Telangana Legislative Council.

Jafri had worked with various news agencies, including BBC and Rediff.com. In 2011, he was elected to the Telangana Legislative Council. In 2017, he was re-elected for the third time.

Career

Journalism 
Jafri did his master's degree of journalism from Osmania University. He has worked with English newspaper Newstime, Deccan Chronicle and with Telugu newspaper Eenadu. Jafri also has been reporter of international news agencies which include BBC, AFP, Reuters, besides being a correspondent at Rediff.com for ten years.

In May 2010, Jafri was felicitated at Basheerbagh in Hyderabad by Andhra Pradesh Union of Working Journalists, Hyderabad Union of Journalists.

Politics 
After being nominated for the All India Majlis-e-Ittehadul Muslimeen party in 2010, Jafri said that it was a "pleasant surprise". He also said that he, being a journalist, would try to represent the disadvantaged sections of the society. After getting elected, he said that the AIMIM party had "honored the media fraternity of the state".

In February 2017, it was announced that Jafri would be retiring from his position on 1 May. In March of that year, he was re-elected unopposed to the Legislative Council for the third time. He did not face any opposition, due to an alliance of All India Majlis-e-Ittehadul Muslimeen and Telangana Rashtra Samiti. He was also the only person from his party to be elected. Mr. Syed Aminul Hasan Jafri also received a certificate from the returning officer Aditya Kumar Singh.

References 

1955 births
Living people
21st-century Indian politicians
All India Majlis-e-Ittehadul Muslimeen politicians
Members of the Telangana Legislative Council
Politicians from Hyderabad, India
Telangana politicians